The 2016–17 FIM Endurance World Championship was the 38th season of the FIM Endurance World Championship, a motorcycle racing series co-organised by the Fédération Internationale de Motocyclisme (FIM) and Eurosport. This season marked the first move to a winter schedule for the championship, with the season starting at the Bol d'Or in September 2016 and concluding at the Suzuka 8 Hours in July 2017. The European rounds were held during the winter to avoid conflicts with the MotoGP and Superbike schedules. GMT 94 Yamaha won their 3rd title.

Calendar and Results

Championship Standings

Teams FIM EWC Championship
(top-15 teams out of 54 ranked)

Riders Championship
(top-10 of 182 drivers)

Manufacturers FIM EWC Championship

References

External links

2016
2016 in motorcycle sport
2017 in motorcycle sport